Moral turpitude is a legal concept in the United States and prior to 1976, Canada, that refers to "an act or behavior that gravely violates the sentiment or accepted standard of the community". This term appears in U.S. immigration law beginning in the 19th century.

The concept of "moral turpitude" might escape precise definition, but it has been described as an "act of baseness, vileness, or depravity in the private and social duties which a man owes to his fellowmen, or to society in general, contrary to the accepted and customary rule of right and duty between man and man."

The classification of a crime or other conduct as constituting moral turpitude has significance in several areas of law. First, a prior conviction of a crime of moral turpitude (or in some jurisdictions, "moral turpitude conduct", even without a conviction) is considered to have a bearing on the honesty of a witness and might be used for purposes of the impeachment of witnesses. Second, offenses involving moral turpitude may be grounds to deny or revoke state professional licenses such as teaching credentials, applications for public notary, licenses to practice law, or other licensed professions. Third, the concept is relevant in contract law since employment contracts and sponsorship agreements often contain a moral turpitude clause which allow the sponsor to terminate a contract without penalty if the employee or sponsored party commits an act of moral turpitude. What sort of acts constitute "moral turpitude" can vary greatly depending on the situation and the exact terms of the contract, but the clause is often invoked in cases involving clearly non-criminal behavior and/or allegations for which there is insufficient evidence for a conviction (assuming the alleged act is even a criminal offense). Fourth, this concept is of great importance for immigration purposes in the United States, Canada (prior to 1976), and some other countries, since offenses defined as instances of moral turpitude are considered bars to immigration into the United States.

American immigration law
A conviction for a crime involving moral turpitude (CIMT) causes a person to be inadmissible to the United States under section 212(a)(2)(a)(i) of the INA (Immigration and Nationality Act). There are petty offense exceptions to this rule, but these exceptions do not change the meaning of the question on the Visa Waiver Program or on the visa application form, and cannot be self-certified. A controlled substance violation causes the alien to be inadmissible to the United States under section 212(a)(2)(i)(II) of the INA. They are two different sections of the law. A controlled substance violation is a CIMT. The immigration administrative proceeding does not use a controlled substance violation as a CIMT. A visa waiver program applicant admissibility is determined at the port of entry and they are subject to section 212(a) and 217 of the INA.

Visa Waiver Program
The second question on document I-94W for those visiting the U.S. on the Visa Waiver Program asks:

Have you ever been arrested or convicted for an offense or crime involving moral turpitude or a violation related to a controlled substance; or been arrested or convicted for two or more offenses for which the aggregate sentence to confinement was five years or more; or been controlled substance trafficker; or are you seeking entry to engage in criminal or immoral activities?

Little guidance is provided to the traveler as to which offenses are included in the definition. However, the Web site of the U.S. embassy in London states that:Travelers who have been arrested, even if the arrest did not result in a criminal conviction, those with criminal records, (the Rehabilitation of Offenders Act does not apply to U.S. visa law), certain serious communicable illnesses, those who have been refused admission into, or have been deported from, the United States, or have previously overstayed on the VWP are not eligible to travel visa-free under the Visa Waiver Program.This appears to be at variance with the question on form I-94W and information supplied by the U.S. Department of Homeland Security, as there are many offenses that are not considered to involve moral turpitude.

U.S. government guidance on determining moral turpitude
A definition of moral turpitude is available for immigration purposes from the Foreign Affairs Manual, available on the U.S. Department of State website. and the U.S. Government Publishing Office website (8 U.S.C. § 1251(a)(2)(A)(i)).

For offenses (or arrests on suspicion of such offenses) occurring outside the U.S., the locally defined offense must be considered against the U.S. definitions, and in such cases, it is the definition of the offense (as defined in the appropriate country) which is considered for immigration purposes, and not the circumstances of the individual's actual case.

Whether a state law offense constitutes a crime involving moral turpitude for federal immigration purposes is decided on a statute by statute basis, because each state statute might cover a different range of behaviors, some of which may not necessarily involve moral turpitude under the Federal definition. For an example of a criminal statute that seems like it would categorically involve moral turpitude, but actually does not because the statute covers some behavior that does not involve moral turpitude, see the Ninth Circuit case Castrijon-Garcia v. Holder, No. 09-73756 (9th Cir. 2013) (simple kidnapping under California Penal Code § 207(a) is not a categorical crime involving moral turpitude). From Pereida v. Wilkinson (2021), the onus is on the immigrant to show that a crime is not one of moral turpitude if they are seeking action under immigration policies.

American Bar and DUI 

An arrest or conviction for a Driving Under the Influence is not necessarily a reason to deny entry to law school or the bar. However, honesty during applications to law school or to sit for the bar is important since it speaks to the character of the applicant. In the eyes of many admissions committees, covering up a past criminal activity is a more serious offense than the crime itself.

While every state is different, most states treat repeat issues involving substance use as evidence of moral turpitude. Substance use, in general, is a serious problem within the legal profession, and substance use affects lawyers at nearly twice the rate of the general population. In a high percentage of cases where a lawyer was suspended or disbarred, he or she was struggling with substance use.

In 2011 the Georgia Supreme Court refused to allow two law school graduates to take the state bar exam partly because they did not reveal their entire criminal histories on their law school applications. John Payne, 57, disclosed all of his criminal history to the state bar, but he did not tell Southern Illinois University about some of his drunken driving history. He had six DUI convictions, as well as other felony and misdemeanor convictions, spanning from his youth to his mid-40s. Roy Yunker Jr., 40, failed to disclose the various DUI offenses to both John Marshall Law School, where he earned his J.D., and to the Georgia State Bar.

American state voting laws 

Some US states, including Georgia and Alabama, have or had laws on the books preventing convicted felons from voting if their crime involved moral turpitude. In at least one case, such a law was struck down by the US Supreme Court as having its roots in Reconstruction era white supremacy. However, voting laws involving moral turpitude remain on the books in both Georgia and Alabama. The definition of moral turpitude has varied in different states and at different times. In Georgia, all felonies are considered to be crimes involving moral turpitude. In Alabama, this was also formerly the case, but in 2017 the restriction was relaxed sufficiently that some more minor felonies, such as drug possession, no longer were considered to involve moral turpitude.

See also
 Good moral character
 Nemo auditur propriam turpitudinem allegans
 Malum in se

References

Immigration to the United States
Legal ethics
Sex crimes in the United States